David Guthrie Freeman (6 September 1920 – 28 June 2001) was an American badminton player from California who became an icon in the sport's history.

Early life
Freeman was born on September 6, 1920 in Pasadena, the son of Robert Freeman, a Presbyterian minister, and Margery Fulton, professor of religion. In 1938 he graduated from Pasadena JC and in 1942 got his B.A. at Pomona College. He entered Harvard Medical School in 1942 and completed its accelerated war-time curriculum in 1945.

Badminton career
During his teenage years Freeman demonstrated exceptional ability in tennis, table tennis, and, particularly, badminton. From early in 1939, at the age of eighteen, through his final tournament match fourteen years later, Freeman was undefeated in badminton singles competition. Displaying his characteristic quickness, agility, and shot-making precision, Freeman won the prestigious All-England Championship on his only try (1949) and remains the sole American to win the men's singles there. In this one-time-only badminton stint in Europe he also won Thomas Cup singles matches against eventual champion Malaya, and captured the Danish Open. In all, he won three matches each against Ooi Teik Hock and the formidable Wong Peng Soon. 

After apparently retiring from badminton in 1950 to concentrate on a career in neurosurgery, Freeman made a brief comeback in 1953. He won the four tournaments that he entered which concluded with the U.S. National Championships in Boston, and a victory in the same hall where he had last lost a singles match fourteen years earlier. He is the only American born male to be inducted into both the U.S. and World Badminton Halls of Fame.

Personal life
Freeman married his wife Addie in 1942 and they had two sons (Rees and Dave) and a daughter (Diana Peterson).

Death
Freeman died on 28 June 2001, at San Diego Hospice. He was 80 and had Merkle cell carcinoma.

Major achievements in badminton

Tennis and other sports
Freeman's racket sport exploits were not limited to badminton. He won the U.S. Junior Tennis Championship in 1938, defeating Welby Van Horn in the final, and with Bill Talbert was the runner-up in U.S. men's doubles in 1943.  Additionally he won the U.S. Army Tennis Championship in 1947; the New England Squash title in 1945; and a variety of table tennis tournaments.

Grand Slam finals

Doubles (1 runner-up)

References

American male badminton players
1920 births
2001 deaths
Pasadena City College alumni
Harvard Medical School alumni
American male tennis players
Tennis people from California
Pomona College alumni